MacConnell's climbing mouse (Rhipidomys macconnelli) is a nocturnal and arboreal rodent species from South America. It is found in Brazil, Guyana and Venezuela, where it inhabits rainforest at elevations from 300 to 2800 m.

References

Rhipidomys
Mammals described in 1900
Taxa named by William Edward de Winton